Spain participated in the Eurovision Song Contest 2003 with an entry selected through the second series of the reality-show Operación Triunfo. Beth with the song "Dime", composed by Jesús María Pérez and Amaya Martínez, was chosen through televoting by the Spanish public. At Eurovision, Beth placed 8th with 81 points.

Before Eurovision

Operación Triunfo 

The second season of Operación Triunfo was broadcast from the Mediapark Studios in Sant Just Desvern, Barcelona and was hosted by Carlos Lozano. After the regular final of Operación Triunfo that took place on 27 January 2003 (where Ainhoa Cantalapiedra was declared the overall winner of the season), the top three contestants - Ainhoa herself, Manuel Carrasco, and Beth - qualified for the Eurovision phase of the contest.

Final
The final took place on 17 February 2003. Three songs were assigned to each contestant among those submitted to national broadcaster TVE, making a total of nine songs. A jury first eliminated one of the songs assigned to each artist, and then a finalist song was chosen for each contestant through televoting. At the close of voting for the second round, Beth with "Dime" received the largest percentage of the vote and was proclaimed the winner.

At Eurovision
On the night of the final Beth performed 12th in the running order, following Russia and preceding Israel. At the close of the voting she had received 81 points, placing 8th of 26. Spain automatically qualified for the grand final, of the 2004 Contest; as part of the "Big Four".

Voting

References 

2003
Countries in the Eurovision Song Contest 2003
Eurovision
Eurovision